Phassus is a genus of moths of the family Hepialidae. There are 21 described species distributed from Mexico south to Brazil.

Species
Phassus absyrtus - Brazil
Phassus agrionides - Brazil
Phassus aurigenus - Costa Rica
Phassus basirei - Mexico
Phassus championi - Guatemala
Phassus costaricensis - Costa Rica
Phassus chrysodidyma - Mexico
Phassus eldorado - Venezuela
Phassus exclamationis - Mexico
Phassus guianensis - Guyana
Phassus huebneri - Mexico
Phassus marcius - Mexico
Phassus n-signatus - Guatemala
Phassus phalerus - Mexico
Phassus pharus - Guatemala
Recorded food plants: Malvaceae, grasses including sugar cane
Phassus pretiosus - Brazil
Phassus rosulentus - Mexico
Phassus smithi - Mexico
Phassus tesselatus
Phassus transversus - Brazil
Phassus triangularis - Mexico

External links
Hepialidae genera

Hepialidae
Exoporia genera
Taxa named by Francis Walker (entomologist)